The 1875–76 season was the fifth season of competitive football by Queen's Park.

Queen's Park played in their traditional black and white hoops and between 1874 and 1876 each player wore distinctive socks.

Scottish Cup

For the third season in a row, Queen's Park won the Scottish Cup after defeating 3rd Lanark RV in a replayed final.

Friendlies

References

1875–76
Queen's Park
1875–76 in Scottish football